Michael Manganello (born 1941 in Hartford, Connecticut) is a retired American Thoroughbred horse racing jockey.

Riding career
He got his start working for trainer Odie Clelland as a stable hand then began riding professionally in 1959 and earned his first win on March 3, 1960 at Fair Grounds Race Course in New Orleans. On June 25, 1964 he rode five straight winners at Ohio's Thistledown Racecourse. He was a long-time fan favorite at Florida Downs in Oldsmar, Florida where he won four races on a single day on February 15, 1968, set a season record with 75 wins in 1969, and by 1975 had won five riding titles. His five wins in the Turfway Park Fall Championship Stakes is the most by any jockey as at 2009.

In 1970, Mike Manganello won the Blue Grass Stakes at Keeneland Race Course in Lexington, Kentucky aboard Dust Commander then rode the colt to a commanding five-length victory in the most prestigious race in American horse racing, the Kentucky Derby. In addition to winning the 1970 Kentucky Derby, Manganello also had mounts in 1969, 1971, 1972 and in 1974. He was the leading stakes rider in 1968.

Retirement
Mike Manganello retired from riding in 1979 and went to work as a horse trainer with his own public stable but returned to riding in 1984. In 1987, he won race number 2,500 of his career at Tampa Bay Downs. He went on to a new career in racing as a race steward for another twenty-five years at various tracks
.

Honors

In April 2005, Mike Manganello was honored for his Kentucky Derby win with his handprints set in concrete on the "Gallop to Glory" walk at the main entrance to the historic Galt House Hotel in Louisville, Kentucky.
He is also honored in the Kentucky Derby Museum in Louisville, Kentucky and was inducted as a Louisville Sports Commission Legend in 2015, Italian American Sports Hall of Fame in November 2017 and the Greater Cleveland Sports Hall of Fame, September 2018. Mike Manganello is a lifetime member of the Jockey's Guild.

Personal life
Mike Manganello is a supporter of the Permanently Disabled Jockeys Fund and enjoys riding his Harley-Davidson and gardening in his spare time. He is currently living in Lexington, Kentucky with his wife Kitty.

References

 January 27, 1975 St. Petersburg Times article titled "Riding star Manganello out for month with injury"
 May 7, 2009 interview with Mike Manganello on the Voice of America radio show Winning Ponies

1941 births
Living people
American jockeys
Sportspeople from Hartford, Connecticut
Sportspeople from Lexington, Kentucky